Jacqueline de la Vega (born January 1, 1960 in Mexico City) is a Mexican show host in Spain and former model.

References

External links

1960 births
Living people
Mexican expatriates in Spain
Mexican female models
People from Mexico City
Spanish television personalities